Michael Cunningham (born November 6, 1952) is an American novelist and screenwriter. He is best known for his 1998 novel The Hours, which won the  Pulitzer Prize for Fiction and the PEN/Faulkner Award in 1999. Cunningham is a senior lecturer of creative writing at Yale University.

Early life and education
Cunningham was born in Cincinnati, Ohio, and grew up in Pasadena, California. He studied English literature at Stanford University, where he earned his degree. Later, at the University of Iowa, he received a Michener Fellowship and was awarded a Master of Fine Arts degree from the Iowa Writers' Workshop. While studying at Iowa, he had short stories published in the Atlantic Monthly and the Paris Review. His short story "White Angel" was later used as a chapter in his novel A Home at the End of the World. It was included in "The Best American Short Stories, 1989", published by Houghton Mifflin.

In 1993, Cunningham received a Guggenheim Fellowship and in 1988 a National Endowment for the Arts Fellowship. In 1995 he was awarded a Whiting Award. Cunningham has taught at the Fine Arts Work Center in Provincetown, Massachusetts, and in the creative writing M.F.A. program at Brooklyn College. He is a senior lecturer of creative writing at Yale University.

Career

The Hours established Cunningham as a major force in the American writing sphere, and his 2010 novel, By Nightfall, was also well received by U.S. critics. Cunningham edited a book of poetry and prose by Walt Whitman, Laws for Creations, and co-wrote, with Susan Minot, a screenplay adapted from Minot's novel Evening. He was a producer for the 2007 film Evening, starring Glenn Close, Toni Collette, and Meryl Streep.

In November 2010, Cunningham judged one of NPR's "Three Minute Fiction" contests.

In April 2018, it was announced that Cunningham would serve as consulting producer for a revival of the Tales of the City miniseries, which is based on Armistead Maupin's book series of the same name. The miniseries premiered on June 7, 2019.

Personal life
Although Cunningham is gay and was in a long-term domestic partnership with psychoanalyst Ken Corbett, he dislikes being referred to as a gay writer, according to a PlanetOut article. While he often writes about gay people, he does not "want the gay aspects of [his] books to be perceived as their single, primary characteristic." Cunningham lives and works in Manhattan.

Bibliography

Novels 

 Golden States (1984)
 A Home at the End of the World (1990)
 Flesh and Blood (1995)
 The Hours (1998)
 Specimen Days (2005)
 By Nightfall (2010)
 The Snow Queen (2014)
 Day (2024)

Short stories 

Collections:
 A Wild Swan and Other Tales (2015), Farrar, Straus and Giroux , collection of 11 short stories:
 "Dis. Enchant.", "A Wild Swan", "Crazy Old Lady", "Jacked", "Poisoned", "A Monkey's Paw", "Little Man", "Steadfast; Tin", "Beasts", "Her Hair", "Ever/After"

Uncollected short stories:
 "White Angel" (1989), later used as a chapter in novel A Home at the End of the World
 "Mister Brother" (1999)
 "The Destruction Artist" (2007), collected in A Memory, a Monologue, a Rant, and a Prayer (2007), edited by Eve Ensler and Mollie Doyle
 "A Wild Swan" (2010), collected in anthology My Mother She Killed Me, My Father He Ate Me: Forty New Fairy Tales (2010), edited by Kate Bernheimer and Carmen Giménez Smith

Non-fiction 

 , article
 Land's End: A Walk in Provincetown (2002), travels
 Company (2008), writing
 About Time: Fashion and Duration (2020), with Andrew Bolton, couture

Screenplays

 A Home at the End of the World (2004)
 Evening (2007)

Contributor

 Drawn by the Sea (2000) (exhibition catalogue text; 110 signed copies)
 The Voyage Out (2001), by Virginia Woolf (Modern Library Classics edition) (Introduction)
 I Am Not This Body: The Pinhole Photographs of Barbara Ess (2001) (Text)
 Washington Square (2004), by Henry James (Signet Classics edition) (Afterword)
 Death in Venice (2004), by Thomas Mann (new translation by Michael Henry Heim) (Introduction)
 Laws for Creations (2006), poems by Walt Whitman (Editor and introduction)
 Fall River Boys (2012), photo book by Richard Renaldi, introductory essay

Adaptations 

 The Hours (2002), film directed by Stephen Daldry, based on novel The Hours
 The Hours (2022), opera with music by Kevin Puts and libretto by Greg Pierce, based on the novel and the film
 A Home at the End of the World (2004), film directed by Michael Mayer, based on novel A Home at the End of the World
 The Destruction Artist (2012), short film directed by Michael Sharpe, based on short story "The Destruction Artist"
 The Hours: A Live Tribute (2016), short film directed by Tim McNeill, based on novel The Hours

Awards and achievements
"White Angel" was included in the 1989 Best American Short Stories.
"Mister Brother" was included in the 2000 O. Henry Prize Stories.

For The Hours, Cunningham was awarded the:
Pulitzer Prize for Fiction - 1999
PEN/Faulkner Award - 1999
Gay, Lesbian, Bisexual, and Transgender Book Award - 1999

In 1995, Cunningham received the a Whiting Award.

In 2011, Cunningham won the Fernanda Pivano Award for American Literature in Italy.

See also
 LGBT culture in New York City
 List of LGBT people from New York City

References

External links

 
 
 2004 article by Randy Shulman from Metro Weekly
 Michael Cunningham's profile in Yale University
 Michael Cunningham's profile at The Whiting Foundation
 Speculative Fiction and the Art of Subversion - Conversation between Michael Cunningham and Margaret Atwood at Key West Literary Seminar

1952 births
20th-century American male writers
20th-century American novelists
21st-century American male writers
21st-century American novelists
American male novelists
American people of Croatian descent
American gay writers
Iowa Writers' Workshop alumni
American LGBT novelists
LGBT people from California
LGBT people from Ohio
Lambda Literary Award for Gay Fiction winners
Stonewall Book Award winners
Living people
Novelists from Ohio
PEN/Faulkner Award for Fiction winners
People from Provincetown, Massachusetts
Postmodern writers
Pulitzer Prize for Fiction winners
Stanford University alumni
University of Iowa alumni
Writers from Cincinnati
Writers from Pasadena, California
Yale University faculty
Brooklyn College faculty
Novelists from California
Members of the American Academy of Arts and Letters